Ambimadiro is a town and commune in Madagascar. It belongs to the district of Antsohihy, which is a part of Sofia Region. The population of the commune was estimated to be approximately 10,000 in 2001 commune census.

Only primary schooling is available. The majority 60% of the population of the commune are farmers, while an additional 25% receives their livelihood from raising livestock. The most important crops are rice and coffee, while other important agricultural products are bananas, maize and cassava.  Services provide employment for 5% of the population. Additionally fishing employs 10% of the population.

References and notes 

Populated places in Sofia Region